Paige Jamie Scholfield (born 19 December 1995) is an English cricketer who currently plays for Sussex,  South East Stars and Southern Brave. An all-rounder, she is a right-handed batter and right-arm medium bowler. She has previously played for Loughborough Lightning and Southern Vipers.

Early life
Scholfield was born on 19 December 1995 in Durban, South Africa. She attended Loughborough College.

Domestic career
Scholfield made her county debut in 2012, for Sussex against Middlesex. She bowled three overs, taking 1/9. A year later, Scholfield was part of the Sussex team that won the 2013 Women's County Championship, and she hit her List A high score, of 48 against Middlesex. In 2014, Scholfield hit her maiden county half-century, scoring 63* in a Twenty20 against Surrey. The next season, she helped her side win the 2015 Women's Twenty20 Cup. In 2017, Scholfield achieved her best T20 bowling figures, taking 3/12 in a victory over Warwickshire. A year later, she achieved her best List A bowling figures, of 3/17 against Surrey. In the 2022 Women's Twenty20 Cup, Scholfield was Sussex's second-highest run-scorer and leading wicket-taker, with 182 runs and 12 wickets.

Scholfield also played for Loughborough Lightning from 2016 to 2017 and Southern Vipers from 2018 to 2019 in the Women's Cricket Super League. In 2016 she hit her highest KSL score, scoring 38 against Lancashire Thunder. In 2019, she was part of the Vipers team that reached the Final, as well as taking two wickets at an average of 13.50.

Scholfield continued playing for Southern Vipers in the 2020 Rachael Heyhoe Flint Trophy. She appeared in all 7 matches, including her side's 38-run victory in the Final over Northern Diamonds, and took 9 wickets at an average of 23.55. In 2021, Scholfield played 5 matches, scoring 93 runs and taking 6 wickets, in the Rachael Heyhoe Flint Trophy as the Vipers retained their title. She was also ever-present in the Charlotte Edwards Cup, and hit a crucial 41* from 36 balls in the final group stage match to beat Lightning off the final ball and qualify for Finals Day. She was also in the Southern Brave squad in The Hundred, but did not play a match. She was ever-present for Southern Vipers in the 2022 season, across the Charlotte Edwards Cup and the Rachael Heyhoe Flint Trophy, with her main contributions coming in the Rachael Heyhoe Flint Trophy, where she made her maiden List A half-century, scoring 74 against Sunrisers, as well as taking 11 wickets overall at an average of 20.09. She was also again in the Southern Brave squad in The Hundred, but did not play a match. At the end of the 2022 season, it was announced that Scholfield had signed for South East Stars.

Scholfield has also been part of various England Academy and Development programmes, beginning in 2012.

References

External links

1995 births
Living people
Cricketers from Durban
Sussex women cricketers
Loughborough Lightning cricketers
Southern Vipers cricketers